Nathaniel Head (May 20, 1828 – November 12, 1883), also known as Natt Head, was an American construction material supplier and Republican politician from Hooksett, New Hampshire. Head served as a member of the House of Representatives, adjutant general of the New Hampshire Militia, state senator, and the 37th governor of New Hampshire.

Biography
Nathaniel Head was born in Hooksett, New Hampshire, on May 20, 1828.  Head was educated at Pembroke Academy, and became active in his family's farming, brick making and lumber businesses.  Head later established a successful railroad construction company, and became active in banking and insurance.

A Republican, Head served in the New Hampshire House of Representatives in 1861 and 1862.  Having been active in the militia as a musician and chief of the governor's staff during the Civil War, he was appointed adjutant general in 1864 and served until 1870.

In 1874, Head ran for the New Hampshire State Senate from the 2nd District, and narrowly placed second to Democrat James Priest. However, Priest had not won an apparent majority, which was required for election to the State Senate under the state constitution. Had no candidate won a majority, the election would have been decided by the whole General Court, which was narrowly controlled by Republicans, likely guaranteeing that Head would be selected. However, Governor James A. Weston and the Democratic majority on the Executive Council rejected all votes cast for Head on the grounds that they "did not contain the full Christian name of the candidate voted for," which made Priest the winner. Priest, along with John Proctor, another Democratic State Senator who was similarly selected, were both seated by the State Senate. The Democratic majority in the Senate ratified the Governor's actions and rejected, on party lines, a challenge to Priest's and Proctor's qualifications. The Republican majority in the State House sought an advisory opinion from the state supreme court, which ultimately concluded that the action of the State Senate was final and unreviewable.

Head was subsequently elected to the State Senate in 1876 and 1877 and served as the President Pro Tempore in his second term.

In 1878, Head was elected Governor and served as the state's first governor elected to a two-year term. During his governorship construction on the state prison begun under his predecessors was completed and the facility became operational.  The state also enacted child labor laws and passed railroad safety measures, including one requiring a telegraph in all railroad stations to facilitate emergency communications.

After leaving office Head returned to his business interests. He died in Hooksett on November 12, 1883, and was buried at Head Cemetery in Hooksett.

References

External links

1828 births
1883 deaths
Republican Party governors of New Hampshire
Republican Party members of the New Hampshire House of Representatives
People from Hooksett, New Hampshire
Republican Party New Hampshire state senators
19th-century American politicians